The Psychopath is a 1966 British horror film directed by Freddie Francis and written by Robert Bloch in Techniscope. It stars Patrick Wymark and Margaret Johnston and was an Amicus production.

Plot
Police inspector Holloway (Patrick Wymark) investigates a string of murders where the victims have dolls attached to their bodies. The trail soon leads to a disabled German woman named Mrs. Von Sturm (Margaret Johnston), who knows a set of dark secrets that may hold the key to the murders.

Cast
 Patrick Wymark as Inspector Holloway
 Margaret Johnston as Mrs. Von Sturm
 John Standing as Mark Von Sturm
 Alexander Knox as Frank Saville
 Judy Huxtable as Louise Saville
 Don Borisenko as Donald Loftis
 Thorley Walters as Martin Roth
 Robert Crewdson as Victor Ledoux
 Colin Gordon as Dr. Glyn
 Tim Barrett as Morgan
 John Harvey as Reinhardt Klermer
 Harold Lang as Briggs

Production
The film was originally known as Schizo. Shooting started September 1965.

The Psychopath was an attempt to capitalize on the success of Hammer Films' recent series of psychological thrillers, including Taste of Fear.

Robert Bloch recalls in his autobiography being taken with his wife to the country in England by Ronald Kirkbride, and "the next morning a limo took us to Shepperton Studios, where we lunched after watching Freddy Francis helm a scene for The Psychopath. The scene that morning was one I had indicated as taking place at the bottom of a staircase leading to the upper floor of a house. But everything they actually shot now took place at the top of a staircase which descended to the cellar. What I wrote up they put down. And when I took director Francis aside and questioned him about the change he pointed out that building a set with a stairway was expensive. Shooting from a high angle into the redressed recess beneath a soundstage trapdoor saved money. In other words, I was right back on The Couch with The Night Walker. A low-budget film always operates on the same principle, that is to say, no principle whatsoever except saving a buck, even if it means losing the potential of the picture".

Reception
The film was very popular in Europe, particularly Italy.

Michael Weldon writes of the film as "a good shocker".

References

External links

 The Psychopath at TCMDB
 
 
  The Psychopath  by TCM Underground

1966 films
British crime films
1960s crime films
Films directed by Freddie Francis
Amicus Productions films
British serial killer films
Films scored by Elisabeth Lutyens
Films with screenplays by Robert Bloch
1960s English-language films
1960s British films